Valdemembra is a river of the Province of Albacete, Spain. It has a length of 85 km and is tributary to the Júcar river.

Rivers of Spain
Rivers of the Province of Albacete
Rivers of Castilla–La Mancha